The Nordic Omsider (English: at last or finally) is a Norwegian amphibious flying boat, designed by Terje Sandvik and Jostein Eide and under development by Nordic Aircraft AS of Kinsarvik. It was introduced at the AERO Friedrichshafen show in 2014. Once in production the aircraft is intended to be supplied complete and ready-to-fly.

Design and development
The Omsider was developed to provide an amphibious aircraft suited to Norwegian conditions. Conceived in the 1980s, development was started in 1999 and 20,000 person-hours and €600,000 have been invested in building the molds and the prototypes.

The design features a cantilever high-wing, with a stub lower wing/float, an enclosed cockpit, with two-seats-in-tandem under a forward-hinged bubble canopy, a T-tail, retractable tricycle landing gear and a single engine in pusher configuration.

The aircraft is made from composite material. Its  span wing mounts flaps. Standard engines available are the  Rotax 912ULS and Rotax 912iS four-stroke powerplants.

The initial prototype was built in Norway and has logged over 500 flying hours. It features outrigger floats. The second prototype was built under contract by ATEC v.o.s. in the Czech Republic. The wings and part of the tail are from the ATEC 321 Faeta and the second prototype features stub wings/floats.

Specifications (Omsider)

See also

References

External links
Official webpage

Omsider
2010s Norwegian civil utility aircraft
Single-engined pusher aircraft
Amphibious aircraft
Flying boats
High-wing aircraft